The Modified Kashin class were six ships built and modified based on the Kashin-class destroyer for the Soviet Navy between 1973 and 1980. Seven more ships were built after that for the Indian Navy. The Soviet designation for the Mod Kashin is Project 61MP.

Added Equipment
The main addition to the selected ships were four SS-N-2C anti-ship missile launchers. A pair of AK-630 30mm gatling guns were installed on the sides of the ship, along with a Bass Tilt fire control radar warranting the removal of two RBU-1000 rocket launchers.  The landing pad mounted on the stern of the normal Kashin classes were replaced with a helicopter platform. The last change made to the Kashins was an increased forward superstructure on two decks.

General characteristics

Displacement - Standard: 3,950 tons, full load: 4,950 tons
Length - 146 m (480 ft), overall
Beam - 15.8 m (52 ft)
Draught - 4.8 m (16 ft)
Propulsions - 2 shaft; COGAG; 4 gas-turbines, 35 knots maximum.
Complement - 320
Armament - 
Surface-to-surface missiles: 4 SS-N-2C launchers; 4 missiles.
Anti-air: 2 twin SA-N-1 launchers; 44 missiles, 4 AK-630 30mm gatling guns.
Anti-submarine: 2 12-barreled RBU-6000 rocket launchers, five rows of 533mm (21 in) torpedo tubes.

Ships

Soviet Navy

Indian Navy

References

Destroyer classes
Ships of the Soviet Navy
Ships of the Russian Navy
Destroyers of the Soviet Navy